Jeffrey John Burrows (born August 19, 1968 in Windsor, Ontario) is the drummer and percussionist for Canadian rock band Crash Karma, and The Tea Party.

Jeff Burrows begun drumming at eleven years of age and professionally since 1990 when he joined childhood friends Jeff Martin and Stuart Chatwood in forming The Tea Party. Burrows' style is influenced by jazz drummers including Buddy Rich, Gene Krupa and Max Roach, as well as rock drummers Neil Peart and Stewart Copeland.

Childhood 
Burrows was born into a musical family. Jeff's father John, a police official and lawyer in Jeff's hometown of LaSalle, Ontario, Canada, was a drummer for Bobby Curtola in the 1960s. John Burrows also backed Motown artists while on the road and has met Berry Gordy, founder of Motown Records. Jeff Burrows' first musical experiences were on the piano, then at eleven years of age he purchased his first drum kit - an old Motown drummer's set of Ludwig drums before graduating to a set of Ludwig Rockers for his Detroit-based band Vavoom! This kit ultimately morphed into his first for The Tea Party.

Professional career

1990-1996 
Burrows signed a cymbal deal with Sabian in 1994, just after The Tea Party's first major-label album Splendor Solis was released. Burrows states that he chose Sabian because "you're getting the same quality as Zildjian but you're getting a company that's more innovative and not in a bad technological way... they still do hand-hammered cymbals."

1997-2005 
With The Tea Party's overseas touring schedule increasing, having a drum kit available became very important.  Burrows was solicited by many companies but decided on Drum Workshop, Burrows explains it is because of their "quality and durability" and "that they would supply me with a drum kit to spec in any country that we traveled to, free of charge" and that "there isn't much of a difference between any of the drums when you are endorsed because they're going to give you the high-end line no matter what, so for me it was about choosing a reputable drum company that is going to provide me with what I need.

2006-present 
After The Tea Party disbanded in 2005, Burrows joined Rush's Geddy Lee and Alex Lifeson, and other Canadian musicians, as drummer in the one-off project the Big Dirty Band, recording a cover of Sonny Curtis' I Fought the Law for the Trailer Park Boys: The Movie soundtrack. Finishing promotion of the Trailer Park Boys movie with Big Dirty Band, Burrows joined Windsor-based musician David Cyrenne in his jam band Is there a Band in the House?, playing venues near Windsor, such as "The Avalon Front".  As of January 2007 Burrows was presenting the midday shift on The Rock, a radio station in Windsor. Burrows continues to record music including with independent band Johnny Hollow, on their album Beyond the Flame and, Lebanese rock band The Kordz.

In 2008 Burrows announced that he, Edwin, Mike Turner and Amir Epstein would form the band Crash Karma, recording their debut album in early 2009.

In 2011, Burrows reunited with his Tea Party bandmates and the trio embarked on a Canadian summer tour.

Equipment

Drums 
 Ludwig Drums (1990–1994)
 Gretsch drums (1995–1996)
 DW (1997–present)
 Two kits: A satin oil finish with gold plated hardware and a tobacco burst finish with chrome hardware. 6-ply maple.
 DW Kick: 24x16"
 Toms
 12x12" tenor
 14x14" and 18x16" floor toms
 Snares
 DW 13x5"
 Antique Ludwigs
 Wood snares
 Metal snares
 Hardware: All hardware is DW except kick pedal and hi-hat stand which are Yamaha

Cymbals 

 Sabian
 Hi Hats: 13" AAX
 Splash: 10", 12" AAX Metal
 Crash: Various AAXplosion
 Ride: 20" AA El Sabors

Skins 

 Remo Drumheads
 Snares: Coated Emperor
 Kick: Pinstripe
 Tom Toms: Clear Emperor

Sticks 
 Signature Pro-Mark 707 drumsticks (Japan Oak) with stick wrap

Philanthropy

The White Ribbon Campaign 

Burrows' first major charitable exercise was with The Tea Party. The band donated all proceeds from the sale of the 1998 CD single "Release", to the White Ribbon Campaign; an organization of men working to end men's violence against women. Burrows, together with The Tea Party participated in the annual White Ribbon Concert, organised by Jeff Martin, from 1998 to 2004. Burrows has also participated in The White Ribbon Campaign's Ivory DadWalk.

Transition to Betterness 
Burrows has raised awareness and funds for Transition to Betterness, a charity based in Windsor, Ontario, which aims to provide a comfortable and compassionate hospital setting to cancer patients and their families within the Windsor and Essex County community. As of January 2007 Burrows' concerts, events and eBay Canada auctions had raised over $300,000 for Transition to Betterness. May 2007 saw Burrows complete a 24-hour drum marathon at the Chubby Pickle in Windsor.

Motorcycle Ride for Dad 
In 2006, Burrows participated in the Windsor, Ontario leg of Motorcycle Ride for Dad, raising funds for prostate cancer research and education.

Burrows utilises social networking website Facebook to promote his charity events, emphasising in particular the work of Transition to Betterness.

Discography

The Tea Party 
The Tea Party (1991)
Capitol Records demo (1992)
Splendor Solis (1993)
The Edges of Twilight (1995)
Alhambra (1996) (Enhanced CD)
Transmission (1997)
Triptych (1999)
Live at the Enmore Theatre (1999)
Tangents: The Tea Party Collection (2000) (compilation)
The Interzone Mantras (2001)
Seven Circles (2004)
The Ocean at the End (2014)
Tx 20 (2017)
Black River EP (2019)

Crash Karma 
 Crash Karma (2010)
 Rock Musique Deluxe (2013)

Big Dirty Band 
 Trailer Park Boys: The Movie (2006) (soundtrack)

As guest 

 Johnny Hollow's Dirty Hands album (2008) (drums)

Videogame soundtracks 
 Road Rash 3D (1998/EA)
 NHL 2002 (2002/EA)
 Prince of Persia: Warrior Within (2004/Ubisoft)

Career highlights 
 Albums released: 8 on EMI Music Canada, 1 on Eternal Discs
 Albums sold: 1.6 million records sold with The Tea Party
 Largest crowd (multi-band bill support): 490,000 people - SARS relief concert, Toronto, Ontario
 Largest crowd (multi-band bill headline): 42,000 people - Edgefest, Park Place, Ontario
 Largest crowd (Tea Party solo show headline): 5,800 people - Hordern Pavilion, Sydney, Australia
 Touring: worldwide touring included Canada 21 times, Australia 12 times, Europe 9 times, USA 8 times
 Notable Support slots and tours: Page and Plant, Ozzy Osbourne, Nine Inch Nails, New Order, Ramones, Lou Reed, Metallica, Soundgarden, Big Day Out, Edgefest, M-One Festival, Alternative Nation, SARS relief concert
 Videos: 21 videos as The Tea Party, 1 video as Big Dirty Band
 Awards (band): 6 MuchMusic Video Awards
 Nominations (band): 14 Juno Award nominations, 21 Much Music Award Nominations

References

External links 
 The Big Dirty Band's myspace page
 The Tea Party

1968 births
Living people
Canadian rock drummers
Canadian male drummers
Canadian songwriters
Canadian radio personalities
Musicians from Windsor, Ontario
Writers from Windsor, Ontario
The Tea Party members
Crash Karma members
Big Dirty Band members